Rampone is a surname. Notable people with the surname include:

Christie Rampone (born 1975), American women's soccer defender
Salvatore Rampone (born 1962), Italian scientist and bodybuilder